Branded Men is a 1931 American pre-Code Western comedy film directed by Phil Rosen and starring Ken Maynard. It was produced and distributed by Tiffany Pictures.

Cast
Ken Maynard as Rod Whitaker
Tarzan as Tarzan (Whitaker's horse)
June Clyde as Dale Wilson
Irving Bacon as Ramrod
Billy Bletcher as Half-A-rod
Charles King as Mace
Hooper Atchley as Ramsey, aka Cunningham
Donald Keith as Bud Wilson
Gladden James as Sam (bookkeeper)
Robert Homans as Chairman
Edmund Cobb as Man giving directions

References

External links

1931 films
Films directed by Phil Rosen
Tiffany Pictures films
1930s Western (genre) comedy films
American Western (genre) comedy films
American black-and-white films
1931 comedy films
1930s American films
1930s English-language films